Henry Prince Devey (September - December 1864 – 1940) was an English footballer who played in The Football League for Aston Villa.

Family
He was one of five brothers who all played professional football, Ted and Will for Small Heath and Jack, Harry and Bob Devey for Aston Villa. Another brother, Abel, was a cricketer with Staffordshire.

Playing career
From 1881 to 1886 Devey played for two clubs for which there are no records, Aston Clarendon F.C. and Montrose F.C. (Birmingham).
From 1886-1887 Devey played for Birmingham Excelsior a club founded in 1869.

Season 1888-89
Harry Devey was a key member of the Aston Villa squad in the Football League inaugural season of 1888–1889. Devey played in the first ever Villa League match on 8 September 1888 at Dudley Road, Wolverhampton then home of Wolverhampton Wanderers. The match ended 1-1. Devey was described as a keen, hard-tackler who had the ability, then rare for a defender at bringing the ball forward. He only missed one game in 1888-1889 and was part of the excellent Aston Villa defence (as Centre-Half) that only conceded 43 goals in 1888-1889 the 3rd lowest in the League in 1888–1889. As a centre-half he played in a defence that achieved one League clean-sheet and kept the opposition to one-League-goal-in-a-match on no less than on eight occasions. Aston Villa finished runners-up.

Professional Baseball

In 1890 Devey played professional baseball for Aston Villa in the National League of Baseball of Great Britain.

Statistics
Source:

References

1860 births
1924 deaths
English footballers
Aston Villa F.C. players
English Football League players
Association football defenders
FA Cup Final players
English baseball players